Kristel Thornell (born 1975) is an Australian novelist. Her first novel, Night Street, co-won The Australian/Vogel Literary Award, and won the Dobbie Literary Award, among other prizes and nominations.

Writing Career 
Thornell's debut novel, Night Street, a fictionalization of the life of the Australian landscape painter Clarice Beckett, co-won the 2009 Australian/Vogel Literary Award and won the Dobbie Literary Award, the Barbara Ramsden Award, and the University of Rochester's Andrew Eiseman Award. Night Street was proposed for study by the Victorian Curriculum and Assessment Authority (VCAA) from 2014 to 2016. In 2012, Thornell was named one of The Sydney Morning Herald Best Young Australian Novelists. Her second novel, On the Blue Train, published by Allen & Unwin in 2016 and inspired by the "disappearance" of Agatha Christie, was described by Kate Evans of ABC Radio National as "an elegant, literary novel about Teresa Neele, the woman Christie claimed to be when she disappeared, and the imagined people she met in this not-quite-sanctuary". In 2017, Thornell was awarded an Australia Council for the Arts International Residency in Rome. Her third novel, The Sirens Sing, is due for publication by HarperCollins/Fourth Estate Australia in 2022.

Published Works 

 Night Street (2010) ISBN 9780864926722
 On the Blue Train (2016) ISBN  9781525231353
 The Sirens Sing (2022) ISBN 9781460762660

Awards 
For Night Street

 2009 – The Australian/Vogel Literary Award
 2010 – F.A.W. Barbara Ramsden Award for Book of the Year
 2011 – Dobbie Literary Award
 2011 – The Sydney Morning Herald Best Young Australian Novelists Award
 2011 – Shortlisted for the Christina Stead Prize for Fiction in the New South Wales Premier's Literary Awards
 2011 – Shortlisted for the Glenda Adams Award for New Writing in the New South Wales Premier's Literary Awards
 2012 – Andrew Eiseman Writers Award for a book written in Western New York

References

External links 
 Official website
 Kristel Thornell imagines Agatha Christie's disappearance in On the Blue Train, Karen Hardy, Sydney Morning Herald, 29 September 2016.

1975 births
Living people
21st-century Australian women writers
Australian women novelists
21st-century Australian novelists